Walter Hudson may refer to:

 Walter Hudson (1944–1991), sixth most obese human in medical history
 Walter Hudson (politician) (1852–1935), English Labour Party politician, MP for Newcastle upon Tyne, 1906–1918
 Wally Hudson (1898–1972), New Zealand Labour Party politician, MP for Mornington (Dunedin), 1946-63
 Walter Richard Austen Hudson (1894–1970), British Conservative Party politician, MP for Kingston upon Hull North, 1950–1959